Temnik is a rural locality (a settlement) in Selenginsky District, Republic of Buryatia, Russia. The population was 610 as of 2010. There are 10 streets.

Geography 
Temnik is located 52 km southwest of Gusinoozyorsk (the district's administrative centre) by road. 5818-y km is the nearest rural locality.

References 

Rural localities in Selenginsky District